Young at Heart is a 1954 American musical film directed by Gordon Douglas and starring Doris Day and Frank Sinatra. Its supporting cast includes Gig Young, Ethel Barrymore, Alan Hale Jr., and Dorothy Malone. The picture was the first of five films that Douglas directed involving Sinatra and was a remake of the 1938 film Four Daughters.

Plot
When songwriter Alex Burke enters the lives of the musical Tuttle family, each of the three daughters falls for him. The family lives in the fictional town of Strafford, Connecticut. Alex's personality is a match for Laurie Tuttle, as both she and Alex are seemingly made for each other.

When a friend of Alex's, Barney Sloan, comes to the Tuttle home to help with some musical arrangements, complications arise. Barney's bleak outlook on life couldn't be any more contradictory to Alex's, and Laurie tries to change his negative attitude. Meanwhile, Laurie's two other sisters, Fran, who is engaged to Bob, and Amy, have feelings for Alex.

The family welcomes Barney into their lives, but a feeling of genuine self-worth escapes him, though he is falling in love with Laurie. Alex proposes to Laurie, and she accepts, which causes Fran to finally marry Bob, and devastates Amy. Aunt Jessie is the only one who knows Amy loves Alex.

When Laurie goes to see Barney about attending the wedding, he tells her he loves her, and that Amy loves Alex, but Laurie doesn't believe him until she goes home and sees Amy crying. She then leaves Alex at the altar, and elopes with Barney. At Christmas, Laurie and Barney go home for the holiday. Laurie tells Amy how much she loves Barney, and that she is pregnant, though she hasn't told Barney yet. Amy has since fallen in love with Ernie. Alex is also there for the holiday, and has found success. With a black cloud perpetually hanging over his head, Barney decides to go with Bob to take Alex to the train. He drops Bob off at the store, and after dropping Alex at the train, he decides to kill himself, feeling that Laurie would be better off with Alex, as he would be a better provider. Barney drives into oncoming traffic during a snowstorm, with his windshield wipers off. Barney lives, and, with a newfound affirmation of life, finally writes the song he had been working on, finding his self-esteem in the arms of Laurie and their new baby.

Cast
 Doris Day – Laurie Tuttle
 Frank Sinatra – Barney Sloan
 Gig Young – Alex Burke
 Ethel Barrymore – Jessie Tuttle
 Dorothy Malone – Fran Tuttle
 Elisabeth Fraser – Amy Tuttle
 Robert Keith – Gregory Tuttle
 Alan Hale Jr. – Robert Neary
 Lonny Chapman – Ernest "Ernie" Nichols

See also
 Frank Sinatra filmography
 Ethel Barrymore on stage, screen and radio

Score and soundtrack
When this film was released, the conductor Ray Heindorf was not given credit, because of the new ruling at that time that stated that he had to be credited as a "Music Supervisor and conducted by" policy, which he disliked. This is one of the Warner musicals that bears no credit to any composer or conductor.

Songs from the soundtrack were released as an album by Frank Sinatra and Doris Day, also titled Young at Heart. An abridged EP entitled Frank Sinatra Sings Songs from "Young at Heart" peaked at #11 on Billboard's "Best Selling EP's" chart while the single reached #2 and was considered Sinatra's comeback single after several years away from the top of the pop singles chart. So popular was the song "Young at Heart" that the film was also titled Young at Heart, having had no title until the song's success. The song's popularity led to its being used not only for the title, but also for music over the opening and closing credits.

References

External links
 
 
 
 

1954 drama films
1954 films
1955 drama films
1955 films
1950s American films
1950s English-language films
1950s musical drama films
American musical drama films
Films based on works by Fannie Hurst
Films directed by Gordon Douglas
Films scored by Ray Heindorf
Warner Bros. films